The Indestructible Wife is a 1919 American silent romantic comedy film directed by Charles Maigne and starring Alice Brady, Percy Marmont and Anne Cornwall.

Cast
 Alice Brady as Charlotte Ordway
 Anne Cornwall as Toots Brooks
 Percy Marmont as Schuyler Horne
 Saxon Kling as Jim Ordway
 Sue Balfour as Mother
 George Backus as Father
 Roy Adams as Brandy
 William A. Williams as Peter Brooks 
 Leonore Hughes as Julia Cleves
 Thomas Donnelly as Butler

References

Bibliography
 Goble, Alan. The Complete Index to Literary Sources in Film. Walter de Gruyter, 1999.

External links
 

1919 films
1919 comedy films
1910s English-language films
American silent feature films
Silent American comedy films
American black-and-white films
Films directed by Charles Maigne
Selznick Pictures films
1910s American films